was a Japanese academic and writer.  Born in Kameyama, Mie, Hattori was a linguist known particularly for his work on premodern Japanese and Japonic languages and the Ainu language. He was a professor at the University of Tokyo.

Selected works
In a statistical overview derived from writings by and about Shiro Hattori, OCLC/WorldCat encompasses roughly 150+ works in 200+ publications in 8 languages and 1,300+ library holdings.

 音聲學 (1951)
  (1959)
  (1964)
 音韻論と正書法: 新日本式つづり方の提唱 (1979)

Awards and honors
 Order of Culture
 Indiana University Prize for Altaic Studies, 1983
 Australian Academy of the Humanities, Honorary Fellow, 1984

Notes

References
 Nussbaum, Louis-Frédéric and Käthe Roth. (2005).  Japan encyclopedia. Cambridge: Harvard University Press. ;  OCLC 58053128

External links
 Australian Academy of the Humanities, obituary

Academic staff of the University of Tokyo
University of Tokyo alumni
1908 births
1995 deaths
People from Mie Prefecture
Recipients of the Order of Culture
Corresponding Fellows of the British Academy
Linguists of Japanese